John Meredyth Lucas (May 1, 1919 – October 19, 2002) was an American writer, director and producer, primarily for television.

Career
Son of screenwriter Bess Meredyth and writer/director Wilfred Lucas, and the adopted son of director Michael Curtiz, Lucas grew up in Southern California, where he attended a number of schools, including Urban Military Academy, Southwestern Military Academy, Pacific Military Academy, and Beverly Hills High School. After a failed attempt at college, he began his Hollywood career with a job as an apprentice script clerk at Warner Brothers.

He is best remembered for the work he did on Star Trek: The Original Series as a writer, producer and director. He wrote four of the episodes broadcast from 1967 to 1969: "The Changeling", "Patterns of Force", "Elaan of Troyius", and "That Which Survives". He also directed three of the episodes broadcast in 1968: "The Ultimate Computer", "The Enterprise Incident" and "Elaan of Troyius". The latter was the only episode in the original series to be directed by its writer. Lucas was also credited as producer for the latter part of the second season (1967–1968).

He also wrote for Mannix, The Fugitive, The Silent Force, Harry O (David Janssen's 1970s series),The Six Million Dollar Man, and the television adaptations of Planet of the Apes and Logan's Run. Dark City (1950) and Peking Express (1951) were among his feature film writing credits. During 1959–1960 he worked in Australia on the TV series Whiplash, directing numerous episodes of the series (several of which were written by later Star Trek creator Gene Roddenberry).

In 1951 he married Australian born actress Joan Winfield. Together they raised three children. After her death in 1978, he remarried. He died in Los Angeles on 19 October 2002 from a leukemia. After his death in 2002, he was cremated and his ashes were later launched into space on a suborbital flight in 2007. They were subsequently launched on an orbital flight on August 2, 2008, however the rocket failed two minutes after launch.

Star Trek episode credits
 1967 - “Obsession” - (Producer)
 1967 – "The Changeling" – (writer)
 1967 – "Journey to Babel" – (producer)
 1968 - "The Gamesters of Triskelion" – (producer)
 1968 - "A Piece of the Action" - (producer) 
 1968 – "Patterns of Force" – (writer) 
 1968 – "The Ultimate Computer" – (director)
 1968 – "The Enterprise Incident" – (director)
 1968 - "Return to Tomorrow" - (producer)
 1968 – "Elaan of Troyius" – (writer and director)
 1969 – "That Which Survives" – (teleplay)

Filmography

Films

Television

References

External links

1919 births
2002 deaths
American television directors
American television producers
American television writers
American male television writers
20th-century American male writers
20th-century American screenwriters